The water polo competition at the 2009 Mediterranean Games took place between June 30 and July 5, 2009 and was contested by 9 teams.

Participating teams

System
The 9 teams were divided into two groups of four and five teams. Teams were awarded three points for a win, one point for a draw. No points were awarded for a defeat. The first and the second in each group advanced to the semi-finals.

Group stage

Group A

June 30

July 1

July 2

Group B

 withdrew from the competition.

June 30

July 1

July 2

5th–8th Places

Medal round

Reference 
2009 Mediterranean Games Standings (Archived) p. 36. (Only medalists cited for Water Polo)

Water Polo
Mediterranean Games
2009
2009